The 2019 Giants Live Wembley was a strongman competition that took place in London, England on the 6th July 2019 at the Wembley Arena. This event was part of the 2019 Giants live tour.

Results of events

Event 1: Max deadlift

Event 2: Farmers Walk
  over a  course.

Event 3: Overhead safe press
  safe press for as many repetitions as possible.

Event 4: Hercules Hold
 Athlete must stand between and hold on to  pillars for as long as possible.

Event 5: Atlas Stones

Final Results

References

Competitions in the United Kingdom
Giants Live competitions